Lutfullah Khairkhwa is an Afghan politician and columnist who is currently serving as Deputy Minister of Higher Education in Afghanistan.

He got his Master's degree in Tafsir from the Faculty of Islamic Studies, International Islamic University, Islamabad.

References

Living people
Taliban government ministers of Afghanistan
International Islamic University, Islamabad alumni
Year of birth missing (living people)